Lunin is a Russian masculine surname, its feminine counterpart is Lunina. It may refer to:

Aristocratic family

House of Lunin, a Russian aristocratic family of Polish origin
Michael Lunin (1787–1845), Russian political philosopher and revolutionary, a member of House Lunin

Other people

Andriy Lunin (born 1999), Ukrainian football player
Anton Lunin (born 1986), Russian football player
Mikhail Lunin (footballer) (born 1978), Russian football coach and former player 
Nikolai Lunin (1907–1970), Soviet Admiral 
Stanislav Lunin (1993–2021), Kazakhstani football player
Zinaida Lunina (born 1989), Belarusian gymnast

Russian-language surnames